Conolidine is an indole alkaloid.  Preliminary reports suggest that it could provide analgesic effects with few of the detrimental side-effects associated with opioids such as morphine, though at present it has only been evaluated in mouse models.

Conolidine was first isolated in 2004 from the bark of the Tabernaemontana divaricata (crepe jasmine) shrub which is used in traditional Chinese medicine.

The first asymmetric total synthesis of conolidine was developed by Micalizio and coworkers in 2011.  This synthetic route allows access to either enantiomer (mirror image) of conolidine via an early enzymatic resolution. Notably, evaluation of the synthetic material resulted in the discovery that both enantiomers of the synthetic compound show analgesic effects.

Syntheses 

The Micalizio route (2011) achieved the end product in 9 steps from a commercially available acetyl-pyridine. Notable reactions include a [2,3]-Still-Wittig rearrangement and a conformationally-controlled intramolecular Mannich cyclization.

The Weinreb group (2014) used a conjugative addition of an indole precursor to an oxime-substituted nitrosoalkene to generate the tetracyclic skeleton of conolidine in 4 steps.

Takayama and colleagues (2016) synthesized conolidine and apparicine through a gold(I)-catalyzed exo-dig synthesis of a racemic piperidinyl aldehyde.

Ohno and Fujii (2016) accessed the tricyclic pre-Mannich intermediate through a chiral gold(I) catalyzed cascade cyclization.

In 2019, a six step synthesis was developed using Gold-catalyzed cyclization reaction and Pictet-Spengler reaction having 19% overall yield.

Pharmacology 
In 2011, the Bohn lab noted antinociception against both chemically induced and inflammation-derived pain, and experiments indicated lack of opioid receptor inhibition,  but were unable to define a particular target. A 2019 study by a cross-site Australian and U.S. group discovered through cultured neuronal networks that conolidine may inhibit the Ca v2.2 channel, a mechanism seen in molecules like conotoxin. The group was unable to rule out partial polypharmacology against other targets.

It has been discovered to bind to novel opioid receptor ACKR3/CXCR7. By binding to that receptor, the endogenous opioid peptides (such as endorphins and enkephalins) cannot be trapped thus increasing availability of those peptides to their target sites.

Derivatives 
DS54360155, a novel compound with a unique and original bicyclic skeleton, is more potent analgesic than conolidine as shown in mice. DS39201083 and DS34942424 are other similar derivatives. They all lack mu-opioid activity. The researchers who found conolidine binding site ACKR3/CKCR7 also developed a synthetic analogue of it called RTI-5152-12. It displays an even greater activity on that receptor.

See also 
 Lochnericine
 Pericine
 Stemmadenine
 Conofoline

References 

Analgesics
Indole alkaloids
Alkaloids found in Apocynaceae